The following are the national records in track cycling in Argentina maintained by the Unión Ciclista de la Republica Argentina.

Men

Women

References

Argentine
Cycle racing in Argentina
Track cycling
track cycling